José María Morelos Buenavista or simply called Buenavista, is a town situated in the northwest of the State of Tlaxcala in the Mexican Republic, located in the municipality of Tlaxco. According to the INEGI in the census of the 2010 its population was 1,762 inhabitants. Its main economic activities are agriculture and cattle herding.

Prominent Figures 
Hermenegildo Sosa
Alvaro Cortes
Arnulfo Mejía Rojas

References 

Populated places in Tlaxcala